The 2017 Women's Cricket World Cup was an international women's cricket tournament that took place in England from 24 June to 23 July 2017. It was the eleventh edition of the Women's Cricket World Cup, and the third to be held in England (after the 1973 and 1993 tournaments). The 2017 World Cup was the first in which all participating players were fully professional. Eight teams qualified to participate in the tournament. England won the final against India at Lord's on 23 July by 9 runs.

Qualification

The 2014–16 ICC Women's Championship, featuring the top eight ranked teams in women's cricket, was the first phase of qualifying for the World Cup, with the top four teams qualifying automatically. The remaining four places were decided at the 2017 World Cup Qualifier, a ten-team event that was held in Sri Lanka in February 2017. This featured the bottom four teams from the ICC Women's Championship and six other teams.

Venues
On 8 February 2016, the International Cricket Council (ICC) announced the five venues for the 2017 Women's World Cup. Lord's hosted the final, and other matches were played at the home grounds of Derbyshire, Leicestershire, Somerset and Gloucestershire.

Squads

The captains of each team were announced on 21 April 2017, with the full squads named shortly after.

Match officials
The ICC announced a panel of thirteen umpires and three match referees to officiate the tournament, including four female umpires, the highest number yet for an ICC global event. The four female umpires were drawn from the ICC's International Umpires Development Panel and their male colleagues from the International Umpires Panel. Richie Richardson is a member of the Elite Match Referees Panel while Steve Bernard and David Jukes are on the Regional Match Referees Panel. Sue Redfern became the first woman to have played in a Women's Cricket World Cup and then stand in a tournament as an umpire.

Umpires

Match Referees

Prize money
The International Cricket Council declared a total prize money pool of US$2 million for the tournament, a tenfold increase from the 2013 World Cup. The prize money was allocated according to the performance of the team as follows:

Group stage
On 8 February 2016, it was announced that in the Group Stage, eight sides will participate in a single-league format with each side playing the other once. This format was last used in the 2005 tournament. The top four sides following the conclusion of the league matches progressed to the semi-finals with the winners meeting at Lord's on 23 July. Therefore, a total of 31 matches were played during the 28-day tournament. The full fixtures for the tournament were announced by the ICC on 8 March 2017, to coincide with International Women's Day. Ahead of the group stage fixtures there were eight practice matches, played between 19 and 22 June 2017.

Teams tied on equal points in the group stage of the tournament were decided by number of wins, followed by net run rate. If both of those were still the same, then the head-to-head match between the two sides was used to determine who progresses to the semi-finals.

Round 1

Round 2

Round 3

Round 4

Round 5

Round 6

Round 7

Knockout stage

Semi-finals

Final

It was announced on 8 February 2016 that Lord's would host the Final on 23 July 2017.

Statistics

Broadcast
In May 2017, the ICC announced that 10 games would be shown live on television, while the remaining 21 matches would be streamed live via the ICC website. The 10 televised matches featured the Decision Review System (DRS) for the first time in women's cricket.

Notes

References

Further reading

External links
 Series home at ESPN Cricinfo

 
2017 in English women's cricket
World Cup

International cricket competitions in 2017
World Cup 2017
July 2017 sports events in the United Kingdom
June 2017 sports events in the United Kingdom
2017